Bob Clemens may refer to:

 Bob Clemens (American football) (born 1933), former fullback in the National Football League
 Bob Clemens (baseball) (1886–1964), Major League Baseball outfielder